Hot Well Dunes is a hot spring in the San Simeon Valley of Arizona, located on BLM land southeast of the town of Safford.

Description
Hot Well Dunes are a series of artesian hot spring wells that are surrounded by 2000 acres of open BLM land. Camping is permitted at the site for a maximum stay of two weeks. There are two main soaking pools surrounded by a low metal fence and gate, cement benches; pit toilets are available on site. The two main pools overlow into a large rock-lined pool, the temperature is lukewarm. The site is surrounded by desert views. There is no trash pick-up at the site, and all trash must be removed by visitors to the hot springs. There are also more primitive soaking areas on-site surrounded by cattails that also provide habitat for wildlife and fish.

Location
Hot Well Dunes are located on BLM land in a remote location the San Simon Valley, far away from any cities or towns.

History
The hot springs were discovered in the late 1920s in this remote area as a during an oil exploration drilling operation. Remnants of the rusted drilling equipment can still be found in the area.

Water profile
The geothermally heated mineral water emerges from the source at a temperature of 106 °F at a rate of 250 gallons per minute.

References

Hot springs of Arizona
Geothermal areas
Bureau of Land Management areas in Arizona
Landforms of Arizona